The New Zealand China Friendship Society Inc (NZCFS) became an Incorporated Society on 10 February 1977. There are currently 14 branches located throughout New Zealand: Auckland, Tauranga, Hamilton, Rotorua, Taranaki, Hawkes Bay, Whanganui, Wairarapa, Manawatu, Wellington, Nelson, Christchurch, Dunedin and Timaru.

The Aims of the New Zealand China Friendship Society are:
To promote friendship, understanding and goodwill between the peoples of China and New Zealand by encouraging visits and exchanges of ideas, information, culture and trade between the two countries.
To foster interest in and promote the study of China, its history, culture, political and social structures – past and present.
To support specific aid projects in China.
To promote the study of the Chinese language by New Zealanders and advanced English studies in this country by Chinese
To foster on-going development of all sister-city links between New Zealand and China.
To assist both visiting students and new migrants from China requiring help to fit into New Zealand society

References

External links
 NZCFS Official Website

Clubs and societies in New Zealand
People's Republic of China friendship associations
China–New Zealand relations